TechTV is a defunct 24-hour cable and satellite channel based in San Francisco featuring news and shows about computers, technology, and the Internet. In 2004, it merged with the G4 gaming channel which ultimately dissolved TechTV programming. At the height of its six-year run, TechTV was broadcast in 70 countries, reached 43 million households, and claimed 1.9 million unique visitors monthly to its website.
A focus on personality-driven product reviews and technical support made it a cultural hub for technology information worldwide, still existing today online through its former hosts' webcasts, most notably the TWiT Network.

The offices were located at 650 Townsend Street, 94103, and the studios, of which there were two, were located at 535 York Street, 94110.

Names
Originally the channel was called ZDTV by its founder, Ziff-Davis, when it debuted on May 11, 1998. It later was owned by Paul Allen's Vulcan Ventures. Vulcan Ventures sold TechTV to G4 Media (owned primarily by Comcast), which merged it with the video game channel G4 in May 2004 to form G4techTV. In February 2005, the name was changed back to G4, eliminating TechTV from the name completely.

Show personalities
The personalities of TechTV include Leo Laporte, Kate Botello, Roger Chang, Yoshi DeHerrera, John C. Dvorak, Carmine Gallo, Ali Hossaini, James Kim, Kris Kosach, Pam Krueger, Chris Leary, Chi-Lan Lieu, Jim Louderback, Tom Merritt, Megan Morrone, Patrick Norton, SuChin Pak, Michaela Pereira, Bill Rafferty, Kevin Rose, Martin Sargent, Catherine Schwartz,  Adam Sessler, Laura Swisher, Morgan Webb, Tammy Cavadias and Liam Mayclem.

Many former hosts of TechTV programs have gone on to create new programs distributed online: Leo Laporte's This Week in Tech, Chris Pirillo's live.pirillo.com, Systm, thebroken, From The Shadows, commandN, Diggnation, Infected with Martin Sargent, DL.TV, CrankyGeeks, InDigital, East Meets West, and Weezy and the Swish are some of the shows produced by alumni.

Leo Laporte hosted Call for Help which aired until April 6, 2007. It was revamped and renamed The Lab with Leo Laporte and was shown on G4techTV Canada and the Australian HOW TO Channel.  The show was filmed in HD and Laporte hoped to have it picked up by an American network. The series has since been cancelled due to poor ratings.

Kevin Rose, who worked on "The Screen Savers" and "Unscrewed with Martin Sargent", co-founded Digg which he featured on "The Screen Savers" in 2004 
, was hired by Google in March 2012, along with many of the employees at Rose's mobile app incubator called Milk.

Former personalities
 Peter Barnes, Fox Business Channel
 Erica Hill, CNN journalist
 Leo Laporte, Leo Laporte's This Week in Tech,  founder of TWiT.tv
 Kris Kosach, Host Audiofile
 Scott Herriot, Anchor of Internet Tonight and Sasquatch Hunter
 Michaela Pereira, anchor of KTTV's "Good Morning LA"
 Chris Pirillo, created own website
 Victoria Recaño, formerly at KTLA
 Becky Worley, tech contributor for ABC TV's Good Morning America
 Liam Mayclem, Formerly Correspondent Internet Tonight Host Audiofile NOW KCBS FOODIE CHAP KCBS RADIO 
Tammy Cavadias, Community Production Manager

Virtual characters
Many of the founding staff of ZDTV had previously worked on MSNBC's The Site, which featured Dev Null, a virtual animated character voiced by Leo Laporte who interacted with host Soledad O'Brien. Improving on the technology used for Dev Null, ZDTV created two animated virtual characters who appeared as hosts for the network. Dash (voiced first by Paul McKinney and later by Patrick Flick and Chris Manners, with body performance by Jessa Brie Moreno and Slater Penney) and Tilde (voiced by Kate Botello and later by Laura LeBleu, with body performance by Jessa Brie Moreno and Slater Penney, in some support chat appearances Tilde was played by Theresa Quinn, Asst Production Manager) appeared in on-air and online promos for the network. Dash also appeared as a virtual correspondent on the show Internet Tonight in a segment called "The Homepage Hall of Fame" and briefly as the host of "Dash's Animation House."

History

ZDTV

The channel originally launched on Monday May 11, 1998, on cable systems in Las Vegas, Detroit, parts of Georgia near Atlanta and parts of Maine. Vulcan Ventures first invested in ZDTV, a network that supplemented content from Ziff-Davis' computer and technology based print publications (at the time including PC Magazine, MacWEEK, and eWEEK), in November 1998, acquiring a one-third interest from Ziff-Davis.  In November 1999, Vulcan purchased the remaining two-thirds in a transaction that was completed on January 21, 2000. The deal (which permitted Vulcan to temporarily continue using the "ZD" initials and "red diamond" logo) was worth approximately $204.8 million.

An early adopter of ZDTV was Charter Communications (also owned by Paul Allen at the time), which began carrying the channel in Newnan, Georgia in July 1998.
Beginning on Saturday August 1, 1998, ZDTV was broadcast in its native San Francisco, when the channel struck a deal with DirecTV to become available on Channel 273, via the providers' satellite dishes.

In July 2000, it was announced that ZDNet would be acquired by CNET, placing ZDTV in the awkward position of using the initials and logo of a company that soon would belong to its main TV programming rival. However, a new name was already being worked on.

TechTV
On September 18, 2000, ZDTV was renamed TechTV, and a new on-air strategy was announced along with several new series including the music-technology series, AudioFile. Soon, TechTV made a huge commitment to enter into live broadcasting when it launched a nine-hour experimental news program called TechLive in April 2001. The show, which catered to day traders and business types, never caught on with TechTV's audience. In November 2001, following a massive round of layoffs, TechLive was divided into three one-hour shows. In the spring of 2002, TechLive was cut further into just one thirty-minute daily news magazine show, with a focus less on tech news and more on how technology changed people's lives.

Beginning March 15, 2001, TechTV experienced repeated layoffs. In 2002, Silicon Spin (an opinion forum hosted by PC Magazine editor John C. Dvorak from the original ZDTV launched in May 1998) and AudioFile (a show for digital music enthusiasts launched in August 2000) were canceled, with its hosts being absorbed onto other network programs. 2003 saw the introduction of several new shows (such as Performance, Robot Wars, and Unscrewed with Martin Sargent).

In late 2001 and early 2002, many Comcast cable systems dropped TechTV from their channel lineups. At the time, some viewers speculated that this was done to eliminate a competitor to the Comcast-owned G4. When Comcast's G4 Media acquired TechTV and merged it with G4 in 2004, a second theory emerged, which suggested that Comcast's actual motive was to lower TechTV's value, and ultimately its asking price.

TechTV was also broadcast over the air on KTQW in Wichita, Kansas until the TechTV name was dropped during the G4 merger.

International distribution
A Canadian version of TechTV launched on September 7, 2001, as a joint venture of TechTV, Rogers Media, and Shaw Communications. The channel would later become G4techTV Canada to coincide with the American merger of TechTV and G4. The channel would change its name once again in mid-2009 to G4 Canada. In 2004, TechTV launched on Foxtel Digital in Australia. After the merger with G4, TechTV (then called G4techTV) left Australia lineups as its international feed ceased. On Malaysia's ASTRO platform, repeats of the international feed was run for some time after the international feed ceased before starting to import G4TV programming and retransmitting them locally on the same channel as the public educational service TV Pendidikan from 2002 to 2006. In Japan, Sony's So-net channel aired several TechTV programs until the fall of 2005 (they aired reruns after May 2004). In New Zealand, TechTV aired on Saturn Communications's channel 34 until May 2004. In addition to those countries, TechTV was broadcast internationally in the United Kingdom.

Merger and consolidation
On March 25, 2004, Comcast's G4 gaming channel announced a merger with TechTV. This move became hugely controversial among loyal fans of TechTV and Leo Laporte, who, because of a contract dispute with Vulcan, left the channel.  Shows with Laporte, including The Screen Savers and Call for Help, continued on with remaining staff taking over his hosting duties.

Around May 6, 2004, G4 announced the termination of 250 employees from the San Francisco office by July 16, 2004, allowing approximately 80 to 100 employees to transition to G4's main office in Los Angeles if they agreed to relocate there. Shows from TechTV that weren't redundant to G4's offerings continued on until July, when the closing of the TechTV Offices would close the respective stages for these shows in turn.

On May 10, 2004, G4 Media completed the acquisition of TechTV from Vulcan. G4techTV was launched in the U.S. on May 28, 2004. This led to the cancellation of many of the TechTV channels throughout carriers across the world (e.g.: systems with both channels active, systems limiting Comcast's number of channels on their lineup, etc.) On January 3, 2005, TechTV International began airing select programs from G4techTV.  After the closure deadline passed on July 16, 2004, only Los Angeles produced shows would air on the new channel. The final production originating at TechTV in San Francisco was the September 2, 2004, episode of The Screen Savers (which was taped on July 16, 2004).

On February 15, 2005, the TechTV brand was dropped from the United States G4techTV feed, leaving the network name as G4 – Video Game Television which also echoed the changes in programming made to the channel due to the merger for both G4's original offering and the greatly diminished TechTV originated shows (exceptions noted below); after that, G4 went through a rebranding and changed most of its programming to position itself as a male-oriented network.

TechTV shows and personalities who survived the merger
The Screen Savers survived somewhat in Attack of the Show!, remaining an open-format hosted talk show.  On March 17, 2005, the staff made an announcement that they intended to reformat The Screen Savers to better fit the network, including the change of its name (a computer term for a program to protect a monitor from burned-in imagery, which no longer fit when The Screen Savers stopped covering computer self-help and DIY programming). It changed to Attack of the Show (a reference to the Star Wars prequel "Attack of the Clones"), and while still covering technology to a lesser extent, it also covers autos, sports, movies, new products and pop culture. Kevin Rose, Sarah Lane, and Brendan Moran stayed on after the transition to Attack of the Show for a short time, but Rose left on May 27, 2005, and both Lane and Moran left after their marriage on April 6, 2006, marking the final TechTV on-camera staff's exit from the program.

Six TechTV personalities, Kevin Rose, Sarah Lane, Morgan Webb, Adam Sessler, Chi-Lan Lieu and Brendan Moran relocated to Los Angeles to join G4.  Only two TechTV shows, Anime Unleashed and X-Play, survived the merger without any major changes. Anime Unleashed (and in turn, all of the anime series which aired on the block) was canceled in March 2006.  X-Play was the last TechTV-created show in production under G4 until it was announced in late 2012 that it and Attack of the Show would both be cancelled in December 2012.

In April 2012, Sessler was let go from G4. A proper reason was not given, however there have been rumors of a contractual dispute. Sessler was the last of the original hosts from the initial launch of ZDTV in 1998. When the network withdrew all their live programming in December 2012, Blair Butler and Webb were the only remaining TechTV personalities working at G4.

Programs
This is a list of programs broadcast by TechTV:

Call for Help (1998-2004)
Computer Shopper (1998-2000)
CyberCrime (1998-2004)
Digital Avenue (1998-2000)
Fresh Gear (1998-2004)
Internet Tonight (1998-2001)
The Money Machine (1998-2001)
The Screen Savers (1998-2004)
Silicon Spin (1998-2001)
TechLive (formerly ZDTV News (1998–2000) and TechTV News (2000–2001)) (2001-2004)
X-Play (formerly GameSpot TV (1998–2001) and Extended Play (2001–2003)) (2003-2004)
Zip File (1998-2001)
Big Thinkers (1999-2002)
AudioFile (2000-2002)
Dash's Animation House (2000-2001)
Working the Web (2000-2001)
You Made It (2000-2001)
Titans of Tech (2001)
Tomorrow's World (2001-2002)
Anime Unleashed (2002-2004)
Eye Drops (2002)
Future Fighting Machines (2002-2004)
Max Headroom (2002-2003)
Secret, Strange & True (2002-2003)
The Tech of (2002-2004)
Techno Games (2002-2004)
Thunderbirds (2002-2004)
Beyond Tomorrow (TV series) (2003-2004)
Body Hits (2003)
Conspiracies (2003)
Invent This! (2003)
Performance (2003-2004)
Robot Wars (2003-2004)
Spy School (2003-2004)
Unscrewed with Martin Sargent (2003-2004)
Wired For Sex (2003-2004)
Nerd Nation (2004)
Living with the Future (international)
Music Wars
Page View
Plastic Surgery (international)
Strange Science (international)

Reunion
A possible TechTV reunion was announced by Leo Laporte in his blog on July 21, 2006. Further details were also announced by Chris Pirillo on his blog.   Nothing further has been mentioned about a reunion of TechTV staff since 2006. Laporte and Patrick Norton, however, did team up for a final skit on the series finale of Attack of the Show.

See also
 Revision3
 TWiT.tv
 CNET TV, TechTV's primary competition until the 2004 merger with G4.  CNET TV once aired syndicated on USA Network and the Sci-Fi Channel (SyFy); it now runs as an online video network and through on-demand service with cable and satellite.

References

External links
TechTV website (redirects to G4 website)
The TechTV Vault
Internet Archive of TechTV website
UndoTV website (redirects to geeks.pirillo.com)
ZDTV starts broadcasting – News.com, May 11, 1998
G4 Canada website , which identified as G4techTV until June 2009.  Continued to host Leo Laporte's TV shows (Call for Help, The Lab) until cancelled in 2008 after sale to Rogers Comm., and shares programming from American-produced shows from Comcast, Turner Broadcasting and other networks.  Owned by Rogers Communications.
DigitalLife TV – Targeted to replace the former TechTV network with the original concept, ownership, and hosts. The network went offline in 2009, with all hosts now employed on Revision3.
Revision3 – An online video network co-founded by Kevin Rose covering technology.  Features Tekzilla with Patrick Norton formerly of The Screen Savers, and diggnation.
TWiT.TV (This Week in Tech)  –Leo Laporte's podcast and online video network aimed at filling the void left by TechTV.  Also hosted This Week in Fun with Sarah Lane and Martin Sargent, until it was put on indefinite hiatus in January 2010.

 
Television channels and stations established in 1998
Television channels and stations disestablished in 2004
G4 Media
X-Play
Defunct television networks in the United States